Émile-Georges De Meyst (1902–1989) was a Belgian film director and screenwriter.

Selected filmography
 1944: Soldiers without Uniforms

External links
 

Belgian film directors
Belgian screenwriters
1902 births
1989 deaths
20th-century screenwriters